Oeum Deceleicum or Oion Dekeleikon was a deme of ancient Attica near Deceleia, so called to distinguish it from the Oeum Cerameicum.

The site of Oeum Deceleicum is located near modern Bogiati.

References

Populated places in ancient Attica
Former populated places in Greece
Demoi